Calosoma sycophanta, the forest caterpillar hunter, is a species of ground beetle belonging to the family Carabidae.

Subspecies and varietas
 Calosoma sycophanta var. severum Chaudoir, 1850
 Calosoma sycophanta var. nigrocyaneum Letzner, 1850
 Calosoma sycophanta var. marginatum Letzner, 1850
 Calosoma sycophanta var. azureum Letzner, 1850
 Calosoma sycophanta var. purpureoaureum Letzner, 1850
 Calosoma sycophanta var. cupreum Letzner, 1850
 Callipara sycophanta rapax Motschoulsky, 1865
 Calosoma sycophanta var. smaragdinum Rossi, 1882
 Calosoma sycophanta var. habelmanni Schilsky, 1888
 Calosoma sycophanta var. purpuripenne Reitter, 1891
 Calosoma sycophanta ab. corvinum Heller, 1897
 Calosoma sycophanta ab. anthracinum Houlbert, 1907
 Calosoma sycophanta prasinum Lapouge, 1907
 Calosoma sycophanta ab. solinfectum Jänichen, 1914
 Calosoma sycophanta var. lapougei Breuning, 1927
 Calosoma (Callipara) sycophanta, Lapouge, 1932
 Calosoma sycophanta nigrosuturale Jaquet, 1930
 Calosoma sycophanta nigroaeneum Polentz, 1937
 Calosoma (Calosoma) sycophanta, Jeannel, 1940
 Calosoma (Calosoma) sycophanta, Gidaspow, 1959
 Calosoma (Calosoma) sycophanta, Deuve, 1997
 Calosoma (Calosoma) sycophanta, Erwin, 2007

Description
This large ground beetle has characteristic metallic bright green elytra, while scutellum is metallic bluish. The head is black. These colors have iridescent shades that change (green, blue, bronze, copper, gold black) according to the direction and quality of light. Pronotum is transverse shaped, posteriorly sharply narrowed, wrinkled and punctured. Elytra are flattened with clearly visible punctures in the striae.

Behavior
This ground beetle  is a voracious consumer of caterpillars (especially Lymantria dispar, Thaumetopoea processionea, Thaumetopoea pityocampa and Euproctis chrysorrhoea) during both its larval stage and as an adult.

As a predator the species has been researched for the effect of its predation upon the caterpillars with microsporidian pathogens, finding a preference for Vairimorpha disparis infected larva.

Distribution
This species  is native to Europe. It is present in most European countries, in the eastern Palearctic realm, in the Nearctic realm, in the Near East, and in North Africa. In 1905 it was imported to New England for control of the gypsy moth.

Gallery

References

sycophanta
Beetles of Europe
Beetles described in 1758
Taxa named by Carl Linnaeus